Maloney's Inheritance is a board game published in 1988 by Ravensburger.

Contents
Maloney's Inheritance is a game in which players get cards depicting cities and the best days to visit them, to secure enough points to win the inheritance.

Reception
Brian Walker reviewed Maloney's Inheritance for Games International magazine, and gave it 3 stars out of 5, and stated that "The game is fun to play but is marred by the changes to the original version that Ravensburger have inexplicably introduced."

Reviews
Jeux & Stratégie #50 (as "L'Héritage de Maloney")

References

Board games introduced in 1988
Ravensburger games